Konstantina Vlachaki (born May 8, 1995 in Chania, Greece) is a female professional volleyball player from Greece, who  plays in the Hellenic Volley League for AEK Athens . From 2014 to 2019 as a member of 
Hellenic powerhouse Olympiacos Piraeus she won 5 Hellenic Championships, 5 Hellenic Cups, and the CEV Women's Challenge Cup in 2018, being also runner-up of the CEV Women's Challenge Cup in 2017.

Sporting achievements

Clubs

International competitions
 2016/2017 : CEV Women's Challenge Cup, with Olympiacos S.F. Piraeus
 2017/2018 : CEV Women's Challenge Cup, with Olympiacos S.F. Piraeus

National championships
 2014/2015  Hellenic Championship, with Olympiacos Piraeus
 2015/2016  Hellenic Championship, with Olympiacos Piraeus
 2016/2017  Hellenic Championship, with Olympiacos Piraeus
 2017/2018  Hellenic Championship, with Olympiacos Piraeus
 2018/2019  Hellenic Championship, with Olympiacos Piraeus

National cups
 2014/2015  Hellenic Cup, with Olympiacos Piraeus
 2015/2016  Hellenic Cup, with Olympiacos Piraeus
 2016/2017  Hellenic Cup, with Olympiacos Piraeus
 2017/2018  Hellenic Cup, with Olympiacos Piraeus
 2018/2019  Hellenic Cup, with Olympiacos Piraeus

References

External links
 profile at greekvolley.gr 
 profile at CEV web site at cev.lu
 Olympiacos Women's Volleyball team roster at CEV web site

1995 births
Living people
Olympiacos Women's Volleyball players
Greek women's volleyball players
Sportspeople from Chania
21st-century Greek women